Thanis Areesngarkul   is a Thai retired professional footballer who played as a forward. He represented Thailand in the 1992 Asian Cup.

External links

Thanis Areesngarkul
Living people
Association football forwards
Thanis Areesngarkul
1992 AFC Asian Cup
1962 births